The 1991 Patriot League men's basketball tournament was played at Hart Center in Worcester, Massachusetts after the conclusion of the 1990–1991 regular season. Top seed  defeated #3 seed , 84–81 (OT) in the championship game, to win the first Patriot League Tournament. The Rams were then defeated by Saint Francis (PA) in one of three play-in games to the  1991 NCAA tournament.

Format
All seven league members participated in the tournament, with teams seeded according to regular season conference record. Regular-season champion Fordham received a bye to the semifinal round, with the other six teams playing a quarterfinal round.

Bracket

* denotes overtime period

References

Tournament
Patriot League men's basketball tournament
Patriot League men's basketball tournament
Patriot League men's basketball tournament
Patriot League men's basketball tournament